Şevval Alpavut (born March 4, 1998) is a Turkish women's football defender currently playing in the First League for Ataşehir Belediyespor with jersey number 9. She is a member of the Turkish national team.

Şevval Alpavut was born in Yenimahalle, Ankara, Turkey on March 4, 1998.

Career

Club
She played with Fomget Gençlik ve Spor in her hometown between 2011 and 2017. In the 2017–18 Women's First League season, she transferred to Kdz. Ereğlispor.

In the 2018–19 league season, she transferred to Ataşehir Belediyespor.

International

Alpavut played for the Turkey girls' U-15, Turkey girls' U-17, and Turkey women's U-19, before she was admitted to the Turkey women's ream.

With the Turkey girls' U-17 tean, sje took part at the 2014 UEFA Women's Under-17 Championship qualification - Group 4, 2014 UEFA Development Tournament, 2015 UEFA Women's Under-17 Championship qualification - Group 8 and 2015 UEFA Women's Under-17 Championship qualification - Elite round Group 1. She capped 27 times for the national U-17 team.

Between 2014 and 2017, she played at the 2015 UEFA Development Tournament, 2016 UEFA Women's Under-19 Championship qualification - Group 4.  She scored two goals for the nTırkey U-19 team, which became champion of the 2016 UEFA Development Tournament. She took part also at the 2017 UEFA Women's Under-19 Championship qualification - Group 10 and Elite round Group 2. She scored two goals in 20 matches.

Alpavut played for the first time in the Turkey women's team at the friendly game against Estonia on 7 April 2018.

Career statistics
.

Honours

International
UEFA Development Tournament
 Turkey women's U-19
 Winners (1): 2016

References

External links

Living people
1998 births
People from Yenimahalle
Footballers from Ankara
Turkish women's footballers
Turkey women's international footballers
Women's association football defenders
Karadeniz Ereğlispor players
Ataşehir Belediyespor players